Gastrolobium nervosum is a small shrub in the pea family (Fabaceae), native to Western Australia.

It was first described as Oxylobium nervosum by Carl Meissner in 1855. It was transferred to the genus, Gastrolobium in 2002 by Chandler, Michael Crisp, Lindy Cayzer, and Bayer.

Distribution & Habitat
It is found from Kalbarri to Zuytdorp Nature Reserve,  growing on sand, clay, gravel and limestone on coastal plains and sandplains.

Etymology 
The specific epithet, nervosum, is a Latin adjective derived from the noun, nervus ("nerve") and describes the plant as having "prominent nerves", or being "strongly nerved".

References

External links
Gastrolobium nervosum occurrence data from Australasian Virtual Herbarium

nervosum
Plants described in 1855
Rosids of Western Australia
Endemic flora of Australia
Taxa named by Carl Meissner